John Leslie Palmer (4 September 1885, Paddington, London – 5 August 1944) was an English author. Under his own name, he wrote extensively about early English actors and about British literary figures. He also wrote fiction under the collaborative pseudonyms Francis Beeding, Christopher Haddon, David Pilgrim and John Somers.

Francis Beeding

As "Francis Beeding", he and Hilary Saint George Saunders co-authored 31 novels, including The House of Dr. Edwardes, later used as the basis for the Hitchcock film Spellbound. The majority, beginning with The Seven Sleepers in 1925 and ending with Three are Thirteen in 1946, can be classified as spy novels.

The Beeding pseudonym was kept secret from its start in 1920,  until in 1925 Saunders delivered a lecture about his writing methods, as Francis Beeding, while Palmer heckled from the audience.  Saunders invited Palmer to the platform, and the dual authorship was revealed.

Nonfiction
He wrote biographies of Molière, Ben Jonson, George Bernard Shaw, and Rudyard Kipling. He also wrote books on Shakespears's comic and political characters.

Fiction
Palmer and Saunders used the collective pseudonym "Francis Beeding" for more than thirty novels, including:
The Seven Sleepers (1925)
The Little White Hag (1926)
The Hidden Kingdom (1927)
The House of Dr. Edwardes (1927)
The Six Proud Walkers (1928). Also serialised in Lancashire Evening Post as Six Proud Walkers (1929). (Colonel Alastair Granby series)
The Five Flamboys (1929) (Colonel Alastair Granby series)
Pretty Sinister (1929) (Colonel Alastair Granby series)
The League of Discontent (1930) (Colonel Alastair Granby series)
The Four Armourers (1930) (Colonel Alastair  Granby series)
Death Walks in Eastrepps (1931)
The Three Fishers (1931) (Ronald Briercliffe series)
Take It Crooked (1931) (Colonel Alastair Granby series)
The Two Undertakers (1933) (Ronald Briercliffe and Colonel Alastair Granby series)
The Emerald Clasp (1933)
The One Sane Man (1934) (Colonel Alastair Granby series)
Mr Bobadil (1934)
The Norwich Victims (1935)
Death in Four Letters (1935)
Nine Waxed Faces (1936) (Colonel Alastair Granby series)
The Eight Crooked Trenches (1936). Also published as Coffin for One. (Colonel Alastair Granby series)
No Fury (1937)
The Erring Under-Secretary (1937). Serialised in Answers as A Wife Too Many between 12 January and 2 February 1935. (Colonel Alastair Granby series)
Hell Let Loose (1937) (Ronald Briercliffe and Colonel Alastair Granby series)
Murder Intended (1938)
The Black Arrows (1938) (Colonel Alastair Granby series)
The Big Fish (1938)
The Ten Holy Horrors (1939) (Colonel Alastair Granby series)
Eleven Were Brave (1940) (Colonel Alastair Granby series)
Not a Bad Show (1940). Also published as Secret Weapon. (Colonel Alastair Granby series)
The Twelve Disguises (1942) (Colonel Alastair Granby series)
There Are Thirteen (1946) (Colonel Alastair Granby series)

As "David Pilgrim", the duo wrote historical novels: 
So Great A Man (1937), a historical novel about Napoleon.
 No Common Glory (1941) about the adventures of one of Charles II's illegitimate sons.
 The Grand Design (1943), sequel to No Common Glory.

References

External links
 
 
 
 

1885 births
1944 deaths
20th-century English writers
English mystery writers
English historical novelists
Writers of historical fiction set in the early modern period
Writers of historical fiction set in the modern age